Colonel Richard Townley (died 1711) was born in England probably at Astlam (Astleham) Manor in Littleton (formerly in Middlesex, today in Surrey). He was the eighth son of Nicholas Townley of Littleton and Joanne White. 

He emigrated to Virginia in the suite of Lord Effingham, Governor of Virginia in 1683. He settled in the Elizabethtown, New Jersey area and married his 2nd wife, Elizabeth Carteret (née. Smith), widow of the first governor of New Jersey Philip Carteret in 1685. 

Townley was one of the East New Jersey Provincial Council during the administration of deputy governor Lord Neill Campbell in 1686. In 1692 and 1697 he was a member of the New York Provincial Council but was accused by New York Governor Lord Bellomont of attending neither.

At the time of his death in April 1711, Richard Townley was Presiding Judge of the Court of Quarter Sessions for Essex County. He left two sons, Charles and Effingham.

References

Members of the New Jersey Provincial Council
English emigrants
1711 deaths
People from Essex County, New Jersey
Members of the East New Jersey Provincial Council
Year of birth unknown